James Auton (28 September 1879 – 22 May 1924) was an English rugby union, and professional rugby league footballer who played in the 1900s and 1910s. He played club level rugby union (RU) for West Hartlepool R.F.C., in the three-quarters, and club level rugby league (RL) for Wakefield Trinity (Heritage № 255), in the three-quarters, and later as a forward (prior to the specialist positions of), during the era of contested scrums,

Background
James Auton was born in Hartlepool, County Durham, England, and he died aged 44 in Salford, Lancashire, England.

Playing career

Challenge Cup Final appearances
James Auton played as a forward, i.e. number 9, in Wakefield Trinity's 17–0 victory over Hull F.C. in the 1909 Challenge Cup Final during the 1908–09 season at Headingley Rugby Stadium, Leeds on Tuesday 20 April 1909, in front of a crowd of 23,587.

County Cup Final appearances
James Auton played as a forward, i.e. number 11, in Wakefield Trinity's 8–2 victory over Huddersfield in the 1910 Yorkshire County Cup Final during the 1910–11 season at Headingley Rugby Stadium, Leeds on Saturday 3 December 1910.

Genealogical information
James Auton's marriage to Mary Ann (née Calvert) was registered on 3 October 1903 in Hartlepool, they had children; Elizabeth Auton (birth registered during second ¼ 1904 in Hartlepool district), Margaret Ann Auton (birth registered during third ¼ 1905 in Wakefield district), James Auton (Junior) (born 6 February 1907 in Wakefield district – death registered 1962 (aged 54–55) in Salford district), and Frederick Auton (born 10 September 1910 in Wakefield – died 16 September 1963 (aged 53) in Blackpool).

References

External links
Search for "Auton" at rugbyleagueproject.org
Wakefield Trinity → History → Preparation and Progress

1879 births
1924 deaths
Durham County RFU players
English rugby league players
English rugby union players
Rugby league forwards
Rugby league players from County Durham
Rugby league utility players
Rugby union players from Hartlepool
Rugby union three-quarters
Wakefield Trinity players
West Hartlepool R.F.C. players